Medway Dragons are a Rugby League club based in Gillingham, Kent. They compete in the London & The South Competitions

History

Medway Dragons were founded on the evening of Friday 30 November 2007 at a meeting of 12 men in the, now demolished, Roseneath public house in Arden Street, Gillingham.  The original plan for two teams at Under 11 and Under 13 was soon surpassed with five teams in the first season.

The primary objective of the club is to provide playing and volunteering opportunities for all in the community.  As well as the Primary, Junior and Men's sections, the club operate Masters and Wheelchair teams.  For a period of time, the club also ran Handball and Netball sections

Medway Dragons launched an open-age team in 2011 and joined the London & South Division of the Rugby League Conference finishing sixth.

In 2012, the team finished 3rd in the South East Regional League of the Rugby League Conference, reaching the play-offs for the first time ever. They were beaten in the semi-final play-offs by Southampton Spitfires 32-14.

In 2013, Dragons finished top of the South East Regional League, before defeating Sussex Merlins 88-6 in the semi-final play-offs. In the Grand Final on Saturday 17 August, Medway Dragons played United Services Portsmouth Navy Seahawks at Medway Park and were defeated 22-27.

The Dragons announced former London Broncos head coach, Rob Powell, as head coach with a plan to become semi-professional and join the Championship One being the only Kent side to play professional rugby league since Kent Invicta.

This period brought huge improvement to the playing standards of the senior teams in the club and Medway Dragons with the First Grade (under Rob Powell) and Under 17 (under Martin Coyd) winning Premierships in 2014 and 2016 respectively. The First Grade went on to beat Cornish Rebels before falling at the semi Final stage to London Chargers in the National Harry Jepson Trophy.

Medway Dragons were crowned as Champions of The London Premier League as they beat Brixton Bulls 38-18 on 18 Sep 21 to complete an outstanding season

Juniors

Medway Dragons' juniors take part in the London Junior League.

Rugby league teams in Kent
Rugby League Conference teams
Rugby clubs established in 2007
English rugby league teams
2007 establishments in England